is a Japanese voice actress and singer from Nakamura-ku, Nagoya. She is affiliated with the IAM Agency.

Early life
Matsui graduated from Aichi Prefectural Gamagori High School. She graduated from the voice actor talent department at Yoyogi Animation Academy. She then joined International Media Academy.

Matsui started watching anime as a child under the influence of her father and older brother, and her mother told her that voice actor Ryōtarō Okiayu played the voice of Yuu Matsuura in the television anime Marmalade Boy.

In 2017 she released her solo album debut Nijiyobi.

Filmography

Anime
Gon (2012), Prairie Dog, Rabbit
Dusk Maiden of Amnesia (2012), Mina Suzuki
Maoyū Maō Yūsha (2013), Mazoku Musume
Log Horizon (2013), Isuzu, Kanako
Akame ga Kill! (2014), Suzuka
Girl Friend Beta (2014), Kaho Mishina
Fairy Tail (2014), Kamika
Locodol (2014), Sumire Mihara
Engaged to the Unidentified (2014), Benio Yonomori
Rail Wars! (2014), Narumi Sawara
Log Horizon 2 (2014), Isuzu
Sabagebu! (2014), Yayoi Isurugi
Castle Town Dandelion (2015), Misaki Sakurada
Chaos Dragon (2015), Gauss
Etotama (2015), Mōtan
Gintama° (2015), Shigeshige Tokugawa (young)
Jewelpet: Magical Change (2015), Mitta Maia Katō
Million Doll (2015), Yurino
Mysterious Joker Season 2 (2015), Cyan
Re-Kan! (2015), Merry-san
Show By Rock!! (2015), Un
The Idolmaster Cinderella Girls (2015), Nao Kamiya
The Idolmaster Cinderella Girls Theater (2017–19), also as Nao Kamiya
Young Black Jack (2015), Mio
Nurse Witch Komugi R (2016), Rei
Onigiri (2016), Yoshitsune
Ninja Slayer From Animation (2015), Machi
Kemono Friends (2017), Brown bear (ep. 11–12)
Tsugumomo (2017), Kokuyō
Armed Girl's Machiavellism (2017), Kirukiru Amō
Magical Girl Site (2018), Kiyoharu Suirenji
Anima Yell! (2018), Inukai-sensei
Mob Psycho 100 II (2019), Emi
Magical Girl Spec-Ops Asuka (2019), Mia Cyrus
Bermuda Triangle: Colorful Pastrale (2019), Poko, Capri
After School Dice Club (2019), Kyōko Maki
Yatogame-chan Kansatsu Nikki 2 Satsume (2020), Rarin Janda
Tsugu Tsugumomo (2020), Kokuyō
Yashahime: Princess Half-Demon (2020) Moe Higurashi
Show by Rock!! Stars!! (2021), Un
Log Horizon: Destruction of the Round Table (2021), Isuzu
PuraOre! Pride of Orange (2021), Runa Hirano
Girls' Frontline (2022), Scorpion
Cap Kakumei Bottleman DX (2022), Nana Appu
Date A Live IV (2022), Artemisia Bell Ashcroft
Smile of the Arsnotoria the Animation (2022), Abramelin

Original video animation
Alice Gear Aegis: Doki! Actress Darake no Mermaid Grand Prix (2021), Yumi Yotsuya

Video games
Kuon no Kizuna (2011), Satoko Amano
Girl Friend BETA (2014), Kaho Mishina
THE IDOLM@STER CINDERELLA GIRLS (2014), Nao Kamiya
THE IDOLM@STER CINDERELLA GIRLS: STARLIGHT STAGE (2015), Nao Kamiya
Kemono Friends (2015), Giroro (Girl Type)
Bullet Girls 2 (2016), Ran Saejima
NightCry (2016), Rooney
Kirara Fantasia (2017), Polka
Magia Record (2017), Haruka Kanade
Yuki Yuna is a Hero: Hanayui no Kirameki (2017), Shizuka Kiryū
Girls' Frontline (2017), M1911, FAMAS, MP40, & Škorpion vz. 61
Alice Gear Aegis (2018), Yumi Yotsuya
Lilycle Rainbow Stage!!! (2019), Hare Kagami
Smile of the Arsnotoria (2021), Abramelin
GrimGrimoire OnceMore (2022), Gaff
World II World (2022), Nappo
Mario + Rabbids Sparks of Hope (2022), Rabbid Rosalina, Dyrad

Dubbing
The Lego Ninjago Movie, Lloyd Garmadon

Other
 Tonari no Kashiwagi-san (2014), Kotori Abekawa

References

External links
 Official blog 
 Official agency profile 
 
 

1989 births
Living people
Japanese women pop singers
Japanese video game actresses
Japanese voice actresses
Voice actresses from Nagoya
21st-century Japanese actresses
21st-century Japanese singers
21st-century Japanese women singers